Teleiodes soyangae is a moth of the family Gelechiidae. It is found in Korea.

The wingspan is 11.5–15 mm. The forewings are scattered with greyish brown scales and there are two to three weakly developed scale tufts. The costal patch is triangular and there is a dark brown central patch. Fuscous scales are scattered near the apex and along the termen. The hindwings are pale grey. Adults have been recorded on wing in May.

References

Moths described in 1992
Teleiodes